Carlo Ninchi (31 May 1896 – 27 April 1974) was an Italian film actor. He appeared in more than 120 films between 1931 and 1963. He was born in Bologna, Emilia-Romagna, and died on 27 April 1974 in Milan, Lombardy, Italy.

Selected filmography

 Before the Jury (1931) - Marcello Barra, il guardacaccia
 Mother Earth (1931) - Il commandatore Bordani
 La stella del cinema (1931)
 La scala (1931) - Avvocato Giulio Terpi - suo marito
 Il solitario della montagna (1931)
 La Wally (1932) - Hagenbach
 Red Passport (1935) - Un passeggero sul 'Santa Fe'
 I Love You Only (1936) - Cesare Baldi
 Conquest of the Air (1936) - Gabriele Adanti di Perugia (uncredited)
 Scipio Africanus: The Defeat of Hannibal (1937) - Lelius
 Cavalleria rusticana (1939) - Alfio
 La conquista dell'aria (1939) - Gabriello Danti
 Dora Nelson (1939) - Giovanni Ferrari
 Scandalo per bene (1940) - Marco Alviano, mercante di vetri
 L'uomo della legione (1940) - Un legionario
 L'arcidiavolo (1940) - Il capitano Fares
 La fanciulla di Portici (1940) - Tommaso 'Masaniello' Aniello
 Lucrezia Borgia (1940) - Ranuccio
 Marco Visconti (1941) - Marco Visconti
 Turbine (1941) - Carlo Rinaldi
 The King's Jester (1941) - Il conte di Saint Vallier
 The Betrothed (1941) - L'Innominato
 La leggenda della primavera (1941)
 Capitan Tempesta (1942) - Moulia El Kader, il "Leone di Damasco"
 Tragic Night (1942) - Stefano
 Il leone di Damasco (1942) - Moulia El Kader, Il "leone di Damasco"
 Invisible Chains (1942) - Carlo Danieli
 Giarabub (1942) - Il maggiore Castagna
 Miliardi, che follia! (1942)
 Luisa Sanfelice (1942) - Il banchiere Gerardo Bacher
 La morte civile (1942) - Corrado
 I due Foscari (1942) - Il doge Francesco Foscari
 Stasera niente di nuovo (1942) - Cesare Manti
 Odessa in Flames (1942) - Il capitano Sergio Teodorescu
 La valle del diavolo (1943) - Il capitano medico Hansel
 In due si soffre meglio (1943) - Roberto Lanzi
 Lively Teresa (1943) - Carlo Mari, padre di Alberto
 Tutta la vita in ventiquattr'ore (1943) - Il commissario
 La signora in nero (1943) - Franco Dossi
 Lacrime di sangue (1944) - Pietro
 The Za-Bum Circus (1944) - (segments "Contatto telefonici" and "Galop finale al circo")
 The Gates of Heaven (1945) - L'accompagnatore del cieco
 The Ten Commandments (1945) - (segment "Io sono il Signore Dio tuo")
 Two Anonymous Letters (1945) - Rossini
 The Song of Life (1945) - Padron Cesare
 O sole mio (1946) - Il fratello di Clara
 The Adulteress (1946) - Dante Viburzi
 Desire (1946) - Giovanni Mirelli
 The Lovers (1946) - Le prince-neveu
 The Ways of Sin (1946) - Don Sebastiano Pinna
 Tempesta d'anime (1946)
 Last Love (1947) - Il cappelano
 The White Primrose (1947) - Capo Banda
 The Captain's Daughter (1947) - Zurin
 Bullet for Stefano (1947) - Don Morini
 The Courier of the King (1947) - Il marchese de la Mole
 Fire Over the Sea (1947) - Stefano
 Call of the Blood (1948) - Salvatore
 Sono io l'assassino (1948)
 Un mese d'onestà (1948) - Procuratore generale Valdes
 L'isola di Montecristo (1948) - Mania
 L'eroe della strada (1948) - Gaetano
 I contrabbandieri del mare (1948) - Maresciallo
 I cavalieri dalle maschere nere (1948) - Duca Coriolano
 Toto Tours Italy (1948) - Dante Alighieri
 Il corriere di ferro (1948) - Buc - detto 'il corriere di ferro'
 The Earth Cries Out (1949) - Comandante della nave
 Fabiola (1949) - Galba
 Totò Le Mokò (1949) - Pépé le Moko
 Hand of Death (1949) - Simone Bossi
 The Iron Swordsman (1949) - Conte Ugolino della Gherardesca
 How I Discovered America (1949) - Gaetano
 Captain Demonio (1950)
 Son of d'Artagnan (1950) - Maresciallo D'Artagnan
 Beauty and the Devil (1950) - Le Prince
 Night Taxi (1950) - Forenti, l'industriale
 The Bread Peddler (1950) - Jacques Garaud aka Paul Harmant
 Side Street Story (1950) - Il brigadiere di Ps
 Songs in the Streets (1950) - Carlone
 The Lion of Amalfi (1950) - Roberto il Guiscardo
 Bluebeard's Six Wives (1950) - Nick Parter
 Rapture (1950)
 The Devil in the Convent (1950) - Milone
 Beauties on Bicycles (1951) - L'impresario
 Without a Flag (1951) - Il Comandante
 Cameriera bella presenza offresi... (1951) - Il sacerdote
 Fiamme sulla laguna (1951)
 Messalina (1951) - Tauro / Taurus
 Amor non ho... però... però (1951) - Maurizio
 Four Red Roses (1951) - Gustavo Leandri
 Operation Mitra (1951)
 Napoleon (1951) - Murat
 The Lovers of Ravello (1951) - Matteo
 The Dream of Zorro (1952) - Don Esteban Contrero
 Anita Garibaldi (1952) - Ciceruacchio
 Red Shirts (1952) - Count Stettin
 Don Lorenzo (1952)
 The Enemy (1952) - Il Monsignore
 Una Croce senza nome (1952) - Prof. Teofilo
 Non ho paura di vivere (1952)
 The Phantom Musketeer (1952) - doge Donato
 La prigioniera della torre di fuoco (1952) - Giovanni Storza
 Sins of Rome (1953) - Marcus Licinius Crassus
 The Most Wanted Man (1953) - Nick le Flicard
 Passione (1953)
 Cavallina storna (1953) - Il capitano Baroni
 Mid-Century Loves (1954) - Count Massimo Micheli (segment "L'amore romantico")
 100 Years of Love (1954) - The Sergeant of Garibaldi's Army (segment "Garibaldina")
 Before the Deluge (1954) - Le président du tribunal
 The Doctor of the Mad (1954) - L'attore
 Naples Is Always Naples (1954) - Andrea Cafiero
 Queen of Babylon (1954) - Sibari
 Rosso e nero (1954)
 La grande avventura (1954) - governatore di Milano
 Chéri-Bibi (1955) - Le Commandant
 The Two Friends (1955) - Pietro Carletti
 Red and Black (1955)
 I giorni più belli (1956) - Uno degli ex alunni
 I miliardari (1956) - Raimondo Ferri
 Ciao, pais... (1956) - Colonello Agosti
 Engaged to Death (1957) - Parisi
 I colpevoli (1957) - Valerio Rossello
 Io, Caterina (1957)
 Il marito (1958) - Il Monsignore
 Two Women (1960) - Filippo, il padre di Michele
 Constantine and the Cross (1961) - Constantius Chlorus
 Musketeers of the Sea (1962) - Conte di Lorna
 Tiger of the Seven Seas (1962) - Tiger

References

External links

1896 births
1974 deaths
Actors from Bologna
Italian male film actors
20th-century Italian male actors